The 2007–08 Philippine Basketball Association (PBA) Philippine Cup or known as the 2007–08 Smart PBA Philippine Cup for sponsorship reasons, is the first conference of the 2007–08 PBA season. The tournament was formally opened on October 14, 2007, and ended on March 2, 2008. The tournament is an All-Filipino format, which doesn't require an import or a pure-foreign player for each team.

The winner will receive the Jun Bernardino Trophy. The Sta. Lucia Realtors needed the maximum seven games to defeat the #1 seed Purefoods Tender Juicy Giants to win their first All-Filipino conference championship.

Format
The following format will be observed for the duration of the conference:
 Double-round robin eliminations; 18 games per team; Teams are then seeded by basis on win–loss records. Ties are broken among points differences of the tied teams or by classification games.
 #10 team will be eliminated
 Teams seeded #6, #7, #8 and #9 play in a single-elimination tournament to determine the wildcard qualifier:
 #6 vs. #9 teams
 #7 vs. #8 teams
Winners of the first round meet each other to determine the wildcard winner
 #3, #4 and #5 teams automatically advance to the best-of-3 quarterfinals:
 #3 team vs. winner of wildcard playoffs
 #4 vs. #5 teams
 #1 and #2 teams automatically advance to the best-of-7 semifinals:
Winner of first quarterfinal vs. #1
Winner of second quarterfinal vs. #2
The winners in the semifinals advance to the best-of-7 Finals. The losers dispute the third-place trophy in a one-game playoff.

Elimination round

Team standings

Schedule

Bracket

Wildcard phase

First round

Second round 

Coca-Cola and Talk 'N Text met in the first wildcard round, with the two teams making a mid-season trade, with Asi Taulava going to the Tigers while Ali Peek and draft picks going to the Phone Pals. Coke, which had previously denied the Phone Pals of a playoff for the last quarterfinal berth by winning their last elimination round game 2 days earlier, started out strong; the Phone Pals failed to answer to the challenge as they were beaten by the #9 seeds.

Air21 on the other hand faced defending champions Barangay Ginebra Kings, which were decimated by injuries to Billy Mamaril, Mark Caguioa and personal commitments by Rudy Hatfield (Hatfield didn't return) early in the season caused several losses and they had to settle for a wildcard berth. Behind the shooting of team captain Wynne Arboleda, Air21 raced to an early lead. Ginebra cut down the deficit, but while Caguioa was on a fastbreak attempt, Niño Canaleta blocked his shot that virtually ended Ginebra's title defense.

On the final wildcard game, Arboleda wasn't able to sustain his shooting as Taulava and Mark Telan had career games to advance to the quarterfinals to face the Alaska Aces.

Quarterfinals

(3) Alaska vs. (9) Coca-Cola
Elimination round games: Alaska won both games, 117-106 and 98-94.

Alaska ended Coca-Cola's run as the worst-seeded wildcard winner as they were eliminated by the #3 seed. Reigning Most Valuable Player Willie Miller made short work of the Tigers backcourt as Joachim Thoss overran the potent Coke frontcourt by converting outside shots.

(4) Red Bull vs. (5) Magnolia
Elimination round games: Red Bull won both games, 94-88 and 107-95.

Magnolia and Red Bull renewed their playoffs rivalry with Red Bull forcing the upset, as Magnolia was rated as the top team during the preseason, with Red Bull being decimated by one-sided trades (ironically to Magnolia). Cyrus Baguio had a coming-out party as he scored a career-high 31 points to win Game 1 for the Bulls. Junthy Valenzuela outplayed former Red Bull players Lordy Tugade and Enrico Villanueva to sweep the Beverage Masters.

The Bulls now clinch their sixth consecutive semifinals appearance.

Semifinals

(1) Purefoods vs. (4) Red Bull
Elimination round games: Red Bull won both games, 87-74 and 97-84.

Purefoods, owing to a couple of weeks' rest blew out Red Bull which had defeated last season's finalists in Game 1. However, Red Bull came back in Game 2 to put up a defensive stand in the fourth quarter to tie the series, 2-2. Team captain Junthy Valenzuela kept the Giants at bay when they were making a run in the final minutes, scoring 2 crucial baskets. Purefoods then did their own pull-away at Game 3, crashing the boards at will; Marc Pingris rebounded a career-high 19 boards.

With a 1-3 series deficit looming, Red Bull again kept a pace with Purefoods in Game 4; however James Yap injured his groin in the first quarter after scoring ten points and didn't return. Purefoods managed to hold-off Red Bull until Cyrus Baguio drove to the basket after a pick-and-roll for an unmolested lay-up to tie the game 86-all. Peter June Simon missed his baseline jumper as time ran out to force overtime. In the extra period, Red Bull made an 11-2 run care of three pointers from Celino Cruz and Francis Adriano to tie the series once again.

After the injury to Yap, Purefoods coach Ryan Gregorio announced prior to Game 5 that Yap would be day-to-day. However, Yap started on Game 5 and Purefoods raced to a 40-17 lead after the first quarter. Red Bull crept up the lead and eventually cut down the lead to two with a minute to go thanks to a trey from Mick Pennisi. In the ensuing possession, Pingris was fouled on the act of shooting; Pingris missed both of his freethrows to give Red Bull another chance. After the time out and with both teams in penalty, Valenzuela was fouled. Valenzuela converted the first but missed the second, which led to a Kerby Raymundo rebound that sealed the win for the Giants.

Needing to win twice in a row to enter the Finals, Red Bull started Game 6 with a 20-1 blast that caught Purefoods flatfooted. The Bulls then cruised on, with Mike Hrabak and Pennisi shooting treys  to tie the series for last time, at 3-all. However, Purefoods started out Game 7 strong but the Barakos answered every Giants run to keep pace; however, thanks to misses from the perimeter by Red Bull and Purefoods' transition defense, the Giants were able to clinch their league-leading 12th All-Filipino Cup finals appearance.

(2) Sta. Lucia vs. (3) Alaska
Elimination round games: Sta. Lucia won both games, 94-88 and 101-96.

Unlike Purefoods which capitalized their long rest, Sta. Lucia had a rusty Game 1 that led to an Alaska blowout. However, Sta. Lucia then had their own blowout game in Game 2 to tie the series. Kelly Williams' dunk at the end of Game 2 was criticized by Alaska coach Tim Cone as a "lack of class".

With her Cebuana mother watching, Williams had a 27-point explosion to pull the Realtors ahead, 2-1. Alaska then turned their offensive game going in Game 4 to tie the series with a 90-83 Game 4 win, leading by as much as 26 points in some stages before the Realtors staged a comeback to cut the lead to two points. Reigning MVP Willie Miller converted three-pointers when the Sta. Lucia came close as he matched Williams' Game 3 output of 27 points to lead all scorers.

The pattern of early blowouts then a furious comeback continued as Sta. Lucia held off Alaska to lead the series, 3-2. Veteran Paolo Mendoza relived his collegiate days as he scored 19 points mostly in the early going. John Ferriols and sophomore Aaron Aban then led another comeback by the Aces to cut down the lead to two. Alaska's Jeffrey Cariaso was ejected from the game after he was assessed with two technical fouls that led to a cold period between the two teams in the final 6 minutes. With the score unchanged, Willie Miller converted a three-point play to tie at 90-all but the Realtors then scored the last 5 points of the game to put them one step closer to their first All-Filipino conference Finals stint.

Like Red Bull, Alaska blew out their Game 6, with Miller and Tony dela Cruz each scoring more 20 points with 4 others reaching double figures. However, like Red Bull, they were closed out by the #2 seeds as the Realtors pounded on the end game, with Dennis Miranda nailing the trey that put the game out reach.

The franchise qualifies for their first ever All-Filipino conference finals stint.

Third place playoff

Finals

Broadcast notes
The Associated Broadcasting Company broadcast all of the games in Philippine TV. Their finals broadcasters are:

Furthermore, the ABS-CBN News Channel carried the Finals live overseas. Sports Radio 918 carried the games live on AM radio.

Featured songs include "How Far We've Come" by Matchbox Twenty and "Shadow of the Day" by Linkin Park.

Awards
Finals Most Valuable Player: Dennis Espino (Sta. Lucia)
Best Player of the Conference: Kelly Williams (Sta. Lucia)
Players of the Week:
October 14–21: James Yap (Purefoods)
October 22–28: Junthy Valenzuela (Red Bull)
October 29 – November 4: Willie Miller (Alaska)
November 5–11: Froilan Baguion (Welcoat)
November 12–18: Lordy Tugade (Magnolia) and Nic Belasco (Welcoat)
November 19–25: James Yap (Purefoods, 2nd time) and Junthy Valenzuela (Red Bull, 2nd time)
November 26 – December 2: Jeffrey Cariaso (Alaska) and Asi Taulava (Coca-Cola)
December 3–9: Kelly Williams (Sta. Lucia)
December 10–16: Asi Taulava (Coca-Cola, 2nd time)
December 17–23: Ryan Reyes (Sta. Lucia; rookie)
December 24–30: Sunday Salvacion (Brgy. Ginebra)
December 31 – January 6: James Yap (Purefoods, 3rd time) and Kelly Williams (Sta. Lucia, 2nd time)
January 7–13: Nelbert Omolon (Sta. Lucia)
January 14–20: Asi Taulava (Coca-Cola, 3rd time) and Mark Telan (Coca-Cola)
January 21–27: Willie Miller (Alaska, 2nd time)
January 28 – February 3: Kelly Williams (Sta. Lucia, 3rd time) and Junthy Valenzuela (Red Bull, 3rd time)
February 4–10: James Yap (Purefoods, 4th time)

Stats leaders

References

External links
 PBA.ph

Philippine Cup
PBA Philippine Cup